Murphy's Law is the debut album by St. Louis rapper Murphy Lee. On October 11, 2003 the album peaked at number 8 on the Billboard 200 music chart. It was released on September 23, 2003 and was certified gold on November 17, 2003. It featured the single from the Bad Boys II Soundtrack "Shake Your Tailfeather" (with Nelly and P. Diddy). Its first official single was "Wat Da Hook Gon Be", which peaked at #17 in the U.S. pop charts, followed by "Luv Me Baby" and " Hold Up".

Track listing
 "Be Myself"
 "Don't Blow It" (featuring City Spud)
 "Hold Up" (featuring Nelly)
 "Granpa Gametight"
 "Luv Me Baby" (featuring Jazze Pha & Sleepy Brown)
 "Murphy's Law (Interlude)"
 "Cool Wit It" (featuring St. Lunatics)
 "This Goes Out" (featuring Nelly, Roscoe, Cardan, Lil Jon, & Lil Wayne)
 "Wat Da Hook Gon' Be" (featuring Jermaine Dupri)
 "So X-Treme" (featuring King Jacob & Jung Tru)
 "How Many Kids You Got (Interlude)"
 "I Better Go" (featuring Avery Storm)
 "Red Hot Riplets" (featuring St. Lunatics)
 "Regular Guy" (featuring Seven)
 "Gods Don't Chill" (featuring King Jacob & Jung Tru)
 "Murphy Lee" (featuring Zee)
 "Head From A Midget (Interlude)"
 "Shake Ya Tailfeather" (featuring Nelly & P. Diddy)
 "Same Ol' Dirty" (featuring Toya)

Charts

Weekly charts

Year-end charts

Certifications

References

2003 debut albums
Murphy Lee albums
Albums produced by Jazze Pha
Albums produced by Jermaine Dupri
Albums produced by Mannie Fresh